Johann Sigismund Scholze alias Sperontes (20 March 1705 in Lobendau bei Liegnitz (today Lubiatów near Złotoryja) 28 September 1750 in Leipzig) was a Silesian music anthologist and poet.

Life
Little is known about the life of Scholze. He was the son of a clerk, and attended school in Liegnitz until the beginning of his studies in Leipzig. In 1729 he was in Leipzig, where on 3 January, he got married with the widow from Halle, with whom he had begun a relationship. The children died young. Only one survived him. His wife died on 12 February 1738. His own funeral in poorer shape was on 30 September 1750.
Stolze published under the pseudonym of Sperontes. We owe the discovery of the real identity of the poet to the musicologist Philipp Spitta, who published in 1885 a fundamental work Sperontes.

Works

Sperontes, singende Muse an der Pleisse, Leipzig, 1736
Das Kätzgen, ein Schäferspiel, Leipzig 1746
Die Kirms, Leipzig 1746
Das Strumpfband, Leipzig 1748
Der Frühling
Der Winter

Sources
Robert L. Marshall and Dianne M. McMullen's article in new Grove Dictionary of Music
P. Spitta: 'Sperontes "Singende Muse an der Pleisse": zur Geschichte des deutschen Hausgesanges im 18. Jahrhundert', 1885
A. Kopp: 'Gedichte von Günther und Sperontes im Volksgesang', Zeitschrift für deutsche Philologie, xxvii, 1895
J.W. Smeed: German Song and its Poetry, 1740–1900, 1987
S. Kross: Geschichte des deutschen Liedes, 1989)

Notes

External links

 Biography at Ostdeutsche Biographie 

1705 births
1750 deaths
People from the Province of Silesia
German poets
German male poets
People from Złotoryja County